The Postal ID (PID) is an identity card issued by the state-owned Philippine Postal Corporation. It is a valid identification document for use by Filipino citizens in availing themselves of various government services and transactions as well as in banking and other financial institutions. It was originally used by postal carriers as a means of verifying the identity of a recipient of a mail or parcel.

The current edition of the card, which was introduced in 2015, contains the holder's biometrics data that also serve as a security feature against identity theft.

The PhilPost's Postal ID was previously made of paper protected only by laminated plastic. PhilPost introduced Postal IDs made of polyvinyl chloride (PVC) plastic in November 2014.

Physical appearance
The identity card bares the following information about the holder:

Postal Reference Number (PRN)
Address
Date of Birth
Nationality (Citizenship)
Signature

The card also contains the issuing postal office and the expiration of the validity of the card.

References

Identity documents of the Philippines
ID